Eusebiu Ștefănescu (3 May 1944 in Câmpina – 15 March 2015 in Bucharest) was a Romanian actor.

After attending for one year the University of Bucharest, he switched to the Institute of Theatre and Film I.L. Caragiale, graduating in 1967.

He died of brain cancer at age 70.

References

1944 births
2015 deaths
People from Câmpina
Romanian male film actors
Romanian male stage actors
20th-century Romanian male actors
Caragiale National University of Theatre and Film alumni
Deaths from cancer in Romania